Raúl Octavio Rivero Falero (born 24 January 1992), known as Octavio Rivero, is a Uruguayan footballer who plays as a striker for Chilean Primera División side Unión Española.

Career

Beginnings and Uruguay teams
Rivero began his playing career at local club Huracán de Treinta y Tres, where despite being a striker he also played as an attacking midfielder. In 2008, he moved to Montevideo to play for Defensor Sporting and remained on the club's youth program for four years.

He joined Central Español in 2012, where his professional career began, and debuted for the first team in a game against Danubio. In his first season as a professional he played 16 games as a starter and finished the championship with three goals. For the next championship he was transferred to Rentistas and begins the most successful cycle of his career as the top scorer of the club with 10 goals and is one of the principal figures of the team finishing the season as one of the top scorers of the Uruguayan Clausura 2014 helping Rentistas qualify to the Copa Sudamericana 2014.

O'Higgins
His great performances with Rentistas led him to sign for Chilean Champion O'Higgins in 2014, where he scored 10 goals in 16 matches, being one of the best players of the Chilean championship.

Vancouver Whitecaps FC 

Rivero's success at O'Higgins attracted the interest of Vancouver Whitecaps FC of Major League Soccer who signed Rivero as a young designated player on 25 December 2014. He scored his first goal for the Whitecaps on his debut, against Toronto FC, giving Vancouver a 1–0 lead, but they ended up losing the game 3–1.  Rivero followed up on his goal with an 86th-minute winner away at Chicago Fire to earn his team a 1–0 win.  Rivero continued his impressive goal scoring form to start his Whitecaps career with his third goal in three games, this time another game winner deep into second half stoppage time away at Orlando City SC, again to earn his team a 1–0 win.  After scoring three goals in four games, Rivero was named MLS Player of the Month for the month of March 2015.  On 4 April, his fifth game with Vancouver, he temporarily took over the league lead in goals with four goals in five games after scoring his team's second goal in a 2–0 win over the LA Galaxy. After that Rivero scored another goal against the Columbus Crew SC in a 2–2 draw earning him a league-leading five goals in six games for the Whitecaps. On 6 July 2016, Rivero completed a transfer to Colo-Colo on the same day that the Chilean club's coaching staff resigned.

Santos Laguna 

Rivero joined Liga MX team Santos Laguna on a loan in January 2020.

Unión Española 
After being a free agent during 2022, he joined Unión Española for the second half of the 2022 Chilean Primera División.

Career statistics

Club

References

External links 
 
 

1992 births
Living people
People from Treinta y Tres
Uruguayan footballers
Uruguayan expatriate footballers
Central Español players
C.A. Rentistas players
O'Higgins F.C. footballers
Vancouver Whitecaps FC players
Colo-Colo footballers
Atlas F.C. footballers
Club Nacional de Football players
Santos Laguna footballers
Unión La Calera footballers
Unión Española footballers
Uruguayan Primera División players
Chilean Primera División players
Major League Soccer players
Liga MX players
Designated Players (MLS)
Uruguayan expatriate sportspeople in Chile
Expatriate footballers in Chile
Uruguayan expatriate sportspeople in Canada
Expatriate soccer players in Canada
Uruguayan expatriate sportspeople in Mexico
Expatriate footballers in Mexico
Uruguay youth international footballers
Association football forwards